Dirac's theorem may refer to:
Dirac's theorem on Hamiltonian cycles, the statement that an -vertex graph in which each vertex has degree at least  must have a Hamiltonian cycle
Dirac's theorem on chordal graphs, the characterization of chordal graphs as graphs in which all minimal separators are cliques
Dirac's theorem on cycles in -connected graphs, the result that for every set of  vertices in a -vertex-connected graph there exists a cycle that passes through all the vertices in the set

See also
Gabriel Andrew Dirac (1925–1984), a graph theorist after whom these three theorems were named
Paul Dirac (1902–1984), a mathematical physicist
Dirac equation in particle physics
Dirac large numbers hypothesis relating the size scale of the universe to the scales between different physical forces